Manthra Mothiram is a 1997 Indian Malayalam film, directed by Sasi Shanker. The film stars Dileep, Nedumudi Venu and Kalabhavan Mani in the lead roles.Though failed to find audience initially later did good business due to positive word of mouth. The film has musical score by Johnson.

Plot

Kumaran (Dileep) is a barber who works for his employer Kurup (N. F. Varghese). He is also an artist at his best friend Pappachan's (Kalabhavan Mani) drama troupe which consists of Abdukka (Mamukkoya), Sundareshan (Indrans), Vakkachan (Machan Varghese) supported by their Church priest Father.Vattakuzhi (Oduvil Unnikrishnan).

Cast
Dileep as Kumaran
Kalabhavan Mani as Pappachan
Nedumudi Venu as CM M.K.S Warrier, Kumaran's father
Rajan P. Dev as Achuthan, Meenakshi's brother
Seline as Lakshmi Kurup
Sathyapriya as Meenakshi, Warrier's wife
Keerthi Gopinath as Bindhu, Warrier's daughter
Indrans as Sundareshan
Mamukkoya as Abdu
Machan Varghese as Vakkachan
Oduvil Unnikrishnan as Father.Vattakuzhi
N. F. Varghese as Kurup
Philomina as Mariyamma, Pappachan's mother
Kanakalatha as Lakshmi's Mother
Spadikam George as George Anthony
Ashokan as Prasad
Swapna Ravi as Kumaran's Mother 
Manka Mahesh as Shakuntala
Kalady Jayan
Hakim Rawther - Cameo Appearance

Soundtrack
The music was composed by Johnson.

References

External links
  
 

1997 films
1990s Malayalam-language films
Films directed by Sasi Shanker